The Bounsall Super Prospector is an American STOL homebuilt aircraft that was designed and produced by Bounsall Aircraft of Mesquite, Nevada, introduced in 1990s. When it was available the aircraft was supplied as a kit or in the form of plans for amateur construction.

Design and development
The Super Prospector has a strut-braced high-wing, a single-seat enclosed cockpit with doors, fixed conventional landing gear and a single engine in tractor configuration.

The aircraft fuselage is made from welded 4130 steel tubing and an optional pre-welded fuselage frame was available as part of the kit. The wing is predominantly of wooden construction, with all surfaces covered in doped aircraft fabric and is supported by "V" struts, with jury struts.

The aircraft has been noted for its all-around pilot visibility and its STOL performance. The manufacturer estimates the construction time from the supplied kit as 500 hours.

Operational history
By 1998 the company reported that three kits had been sold.

In December 2013 one example was registered in the United States with the Federal Aviation Administration, although at one time five had been registered.

Specifications (Super Prospector)

References

External links
Photo of a Super Prospector

Super Prospector
1990s United States civil utility aircraft
1990s United States ultralight aircraft
Single-engined tractor aircraft
High-wing aircraft
Homebuilt aircraft